is a single-member constituency of the House of Representatives in the Diet of Japan. It is located in Southern Fukushima and consists of the cities of Shirakawa, Sukagawa, Tamura and the districts of Iwase, Higashishirakawa, Ishikawa, Tamura and Nishishirakawa (except for the village of Nishigō). As of 2012, 293,378 eligible voters were registered in the district.

Before the electoral reform of 1994, the area had been part of the multi-member Fukushima 2nd district that elected five Representatives by single non-transferable vote.

After the district's creation, then Liberal Democrat Hiroyuki Arai (later New Party Nippon, New Renaissance Party) narrowly beat Democrat Kōichirō Genba who won a seat in the Tōhoku proportional representation block. Both had been elected to the House in the pre-reform 2nd district in 1993 for the first time. Since the LDP was using the Costa Rica method (kosuta rika hōshiki) in Fukushima 3rd district, Arai only ran in the PR block in the 2000 general election and was replaced by Yoshiyuki Hozumi as district candidate, another of the three former LDP representatives from the pre-reform 2nd district (The third, Fumiaki Saitō, stood as LDP candidate in Fukushima 4th district in 1996, but lost). But Genba won the 3rd district in 2000 and has held onto the district seat since. After Arai's unsuccessful re-run in 2003, the LDP discontinued the Costa Rica alternation. Genba was appointed minister of state and Democratic Party policy affairs chief under party president/prime minister Naoto Kan in 2010.

List of representatives

Election results

References 

Fukushima Prefecture
Districts of the House of Representatives (Japan)